Lars Martin Engedal (born 11 September 1983) is a Norwegian football defender.

As a youth player Engedal played for FK Vigør. He then joined IK Start at the age of sixteen, debuted for the senior team in 2003 and played there until 2008. He joined Moss FK ahead of the 2009 season. After the 2009 season he joined Flekkerøy IL.

He has been capped for the Norwegian national under-21 team.

References

1983 births
Living people
Sportspeople from Kristiansand
Norwegian footballers
IK Start players
Moss FK players
Flekkerøy IL players
Norwegian First Division players
Eliteserien players
Association football defenders